JADE was the codename given by US codebreakers to a Japanese World War II cipher machine. The Imperial Japanese Navy used the machine for communications from late 1942 until 1944. JADE was similar to another cipher machine, CORAL, with the main difference that JADE was used to encipher messages in katakana using an alphabet of 50 symbols.

According to the NSA, "apparently, the JADE machine did not stand up to heavy usage in the field, and, after an initial high volume of traffic, it was used much less." While CORAL traffic was also low, an important user was a Japanese representative, Vice Admiral Abe, to an Axis war-planning council whose reports coded in CORAL were intercepted and proved vital to Allied planning in the European theater.

See also
 Purple
 RED

External links
 TENTATIVE LIST OF ENIGMA AND OTHER MACHINE USAGES 30 March 1945 — JADE is covered

References

References from Japanese Wikipedia
Separate Mathematical Sciences Cryptography, Science Inc., 1982, “Deciphering Japanese Machine Cryptography in the United States and Its Theoretical Considerations”, Masataka Kato
Machine Cryptography and Modern Cryptanalysis, Cipher A. Deavours, Louis Kruh, ARTECH HOUSE, 1985
BIG MACHINES, Stephen J. Kelley, Aegean Park Press, 2001
"Naval Operational Communication History", Guard Corps School of Art, Showa 28
"Shin Takayama Tore 128," Miyauchi Kanto, Rokuko Publishing, 1975
History of Kitajima Island Naval Forces, "Cryptographic Printing Machine and Thin-Bar Type Replacement Board", Kakuji Ishigami, 1985
"A review of correspondence warfare and correspondence warfare measures", Yoshio Nakano, 1955

Encryption devices
World War II Japanese cryptography